Aimery Pinga Maria (born 6 January 1998), is a Swiss professional footballer who plays as a forward for Virton.

Professional career
Born in Fribourg, Pinga joined FC Sion in 2016. Pinga made his professional debut for Sion in a 1-0 Swiss Super League loss to Young Boys on 7 May 2017.

International career
Pinga was born in Switzerland and is of Congolese and Angolan descent. Pinga is a youth international for Switzerland.

References

External links
 
 SFL Profile
 FC Sion Profile

1998 births
Living people
People from Fribourg
Swiss men's footballers
Swiss expatriate footballers
Switzerland youth international footballers
FC Sion players
Grasshopper Club Zürich players
FC Andorra players
Swiss Super League players
Segunda División B players
Association football forwards
Swiss people of Democratic Republic of the Congo descent
Swiss sportspeople of African descent
Swiss people of Angolan descent
Swiss expatriate sportspeople in Spain
Expatriate footballers in Spain
R.E. Virton players
Expatriate footballers in Belgium
Swiss expatriate sportspeople in Belgium
Challenger Pro League players
Swiss Promotion League players
Sportspeople from the canton of Fribourg